Kennan is both a surname and a given name. Notable people with the name include:

Surname:
 Elizabeth Topham Kennan (born 1938), American academic
 George Kennan (explorer) (1845–1924), American explorer of Russia and an early "Russia Expert" 
 George F. Kennan (1904–2005), member of the United States Foreign Service and considered to be the "architect" of American Cold War strategy
 Jim Kennan (1946–2010), Australian politician and adjunct professor of law
 Kent Kennan (1913–2003), American educator and composer 
 Larry Kennan (born 1944), former American football coach

Given name:
 Kennan Adeang, (born circa 1942) former president of Nauru